Sir Thomas Innes of Learney  (1893–1971) was a Scottish officer of arms who was Lord Lyon from 1945 to 1969. 

He was Carrick Pursuivant and Albany Herald in the 1920s and 1930s. He was a very active Lord Lyon, strongly promoting his views of what his office was through his writings and pronouncements in his Court. In 1950, he convinced the Scots Law Times to start publishing the decisions made in Lyon Court. By ruling on uncontested petitions, he was able to expound many of his theories in court but not under review of his superior court, and get them published in the judicial record. His treatise, Scots Heraldry, was first published in 1934 when he was Carrick Pursuivant; then a second, enlarged edition came out in 1956, and it has practically eclipsed earlier works on the subject. Following his retirement as Lord Lyon in 1969, he was appointed Marchmont Herald, and continued as Secretary of the Order of the Thistle until 1971.

Innes of Learney's writings contain a number of theories which, at a time when English armorial law had come to dominate even Scottish heraldry, may have seemed quite novel, despite his claims that they were grounded in Scotland's feudal past. Most notable is the claim that a grant of arms in Scotland confers what he calls "noblesse" and equates with nobility in the original sense, namely basic untitled nobility possessed by everyone noble, from Gentleman to Duke – though the word is nowadays generally taken to mean exclusively the Peerage, which is why the French word noblesse seemed to him a better term. There are also other claims, such as his right to decide disputes over chiefships of clans or branches of clans, his right to decide disputes of precedence, his right to confer nobility to non-physical persons such as corporations or associations, etc. These rights are still (2007) being exercised by the Court of the Lord Lyon. As a jurist, in 'Scots Heraldry' and in his revision of Adam's The Clans, Septs and Regiments of the Scottish Highlands as well as in The Tartans of the Clans and Families of Scotland he offers evidence from ancient legal documents as well as more recent parliament and court decisions to support his position.

Innes was appointed a Knight Commander of the Royal Victorian Order (KCVO) in the 1946 Birthday Honours and a Knight Grand Cross of the same Order in the 1967 Birthday Honours.

Written works
Armorial Conveyancing (by Learney as Albany Herald, in: Notes and Queries.1941; 180: 128–133).
Adams, Frank, revised by Sir Thomas Innes of Learney, Lord Lyon King of Arms, The Clans, Septs and Regiments of the Scottish Highlands, 4th ed. Edinburgh & London 1952. (First published 1908, 2nd ed. 1924, 3rd ed. 1934)[Important and authoritative additions by Learney as the Lord Lyon King of Arms.]
Law of Succession in Ensigns Armorial (in: Notes and Queries?).
Scots Heraldry, W. & A.K. Johnston Limited, Edinburgh & London: 1938. 2nd ed. revised and enlarged, Edinburgh & London 1956. 3rd ed. revised by Malcolm R. Innes of Edingight, Marchmont Herald (his son, later Lord Lyon King of Arms) London & Edinburgh 1978.
The Tartans of the Clans and Families of Scotland, 1st ed. 1938, 2nd ed. 1945, 3rd ed. 1947, 4th ed. 1948, 5th ed. 1950,reprinted 1952, 6th ed. 1958, 7th ed. Edinburgh & London 1964.
 The Scottish Tartans with Historical Sketches of the Clans and Families of Scotland. The Arms of Chiefs of Clans and Families and Clansmen's Badges, Illustrated by William Semple. W. & A. K. Johnston & G. W. Bacon Ltd., Edinburgh and London, revised and reprinted edition 1966.

Arms

See also
Heraldry
Pursuivant
Herald

References

External links
Court of the Lord Lyon
The Heraldry Society of Scotland

|-

1893 births
1971 deaths
Lord Lyon Kings of Arms
Knights Grand Cross of the Royal Victorian Order